Matthew "Matt" Nelson (born November 12, 1977 in Tampa, Florida) is a retired American soccer goalkeeper who was the head coach of the Appalachian State Mountaineers men's soccer team.  He played professionally in the USL First Division and Major League Soccer.

Player
Nelson attended Lynn University, playing on the men's soccer team from 1996 to 1999.  He compiled thirty-one shutouts and forty-nine wins in fifty-nine games.  He was a 1999 NSCAA Division II Scholar All American.  Nelson graduated with a bachelor's degree in international business.

In 2000, Nelson began his post-collegiate career with the Cape Cod Crusaders of the USISL D3-Pro League.  That season, he earned D2-Pro League Goalkeeper of the Year honors after posting a 0.73 goals against average.  After the Crusaders were eliminated from the playoffs, Nelson joined the Boston Bulldogs of the USL A-League for three games, allowing only one goal.  The Columbus Crew then called him up for the last two games of the Major League Soccer season.  Nelson then moved to Ireland and joined Kilkenny City A.F.C.  He played sixteen league games before gaining his release outside of the transfer window in April 2001.  With that in hand, Nelson returned to the United States and joined the Portland Timbers but was released a month later.  In 2002, he signed with the South Jersey Barons of the USL D3-Pro League.  When the D3-Pro League season ended the last week of July 2002, the Hampton Roads Mariners quickly signed Nelson for the rest of the A-League season.  In 2003, the Mariners became known as the Virginia Beach Mariners.  Nelson stayed with the team through the 2006 season.  The Mariners folded at the end of the 2006 season and Nelson signed with the Harrisburg City Islanders of the USL Second Division in 2007.  That season, he recorded a league-leading ten shutouts and a 10–4–4 record.  He also had the league’s second best goals-against-average at 0.611 and was selected to the USL-2 All-League Second Team while backstopping the Islanders to the USL Second Division championship. On July 27, 2007 the Vancouver Whitecaps acquired Nelson on loan for the last three games of the USL First Division season.  The Whitecaps wanted Nelson to play for them in 2008, but he declined.  Nelson signed with Crystal Palace Baltimore in the USL Second Division on April 7, 2008.  In the second round of the Lamar Hunt U.S. Open Cup Nelson saved three penalties in a penalty shoot out against his former team, the Islanders, to send Palace through to the next round against MLS side New York Red Bulls.  Against the Red Bulls Nelson kept a clean sheet and made seven saves which helped send Palace through to the quarter finals of the competition against the New England Revolution.  Palace released Nelson from his contract on July 18, 2008 and he was reacquired by the Harrisburg City Islanders for the remainder of the 2008 season.

Coach
In 2003, Virginia Wesleyan College hired Nelson as a goalkeeper coach.  In 2005, he moved to The College of William & Mary as an assistant with the women's soccer team.  In 2008, Appalachian State University hired Nelson as its assistant coach to head coach Shaun Pendleton.  Pendleton had coached Nelson at Lynn University.  On September 7, 2011, Nelson found Pendleton dead at home.  The University elevated Nelson to interim head coach for the remainder of the season.  Nelson was named the Southern Conference Men’s Soccer Coach of the Year and the University named him permanent head coach on December 5, 2011.

Notes

External links
 Appalachian State coaching bio
 

1977 births
Living people
American soccer coaches
American soccer players
American expatriate soccer players
Appalachian State Mountaineers men's soccer coaches
Cape Cod Crusaders players
Columbus Crew players
Crystal Palace Baltimore players
Boston Bulldogs (soccer) players
Penn FC players
Ocean City Nor'easters players
Portland Timbers (2001–2010) players
USL First Division players
USL Second Division players
Vancouver Whitecaps (1986–2010) players
Virginia Beach Mariners players
Soccer players from Florida
Lynn Fighting Knights men's soccer players
Association football goalkeepers
William & Mary Tribe men's soccer coaches
Virginia Wesleyan Marlins men's soccer coaches
Expatriate association footballers in Ireland
Kilkenny City A.F.C. players
League of Ireland players
Expatriate association footballers in the Republic of Ireland